Izhak  Graziani ( (August 4, 1924 - July 7, 2003) was an Israeli music conductor.

Biography

Izhak ("Ziko") Graziani was born in Ruse, Bulgaria, where he studied music and conducting. In 1948, he immigrated to Israel and joined the  IDF Orchestra as a trumpet player.

Music career
Graziani played with the orchestra until 1952. In 1960, after the retirement of conductor Shalom Ronli-Riklis, Graziani took his place. He went on to become conductor of the IBA Radio Orchestra (later renamed IBA Radio and TV Orchestra).
 
Graziani was also Music Director of the Eurovision Song Contest 1979.

Graziani retired in 2003 and died three months later.

He collaborated with Leonard Bernstein.

See also
Music of Israel

References 

1924 births
2003 deaths
Graziani
20th-century Israeli male musicians
Jewish Israeli musicians
People from Ruse, Bulgaria
Eurovision Song Contest conductors
Israeli people of Bulgarian-Jewish descent
Bulgarian emigrants to Israel
20th-century conductors (music)
Israeli military musicians
Burials at Kiryat Shaul Cemetery